The 1977 NCAA Division II baseball tournament decided the champion of baseball in NCAA Division II for the 1977 season. UC Riverside coach Jack Smitherman won his first title with the team, while Joe Lefebvre of Eckerd and Steve Glaum of UC Riverside were named Tournament Co-Most Outstanding Players.

Regionals
The regionals consisted 31 teams in eight groupings. There were five 4-team brackets, one 6-team bracket, one 3-team bracket, and one 2-team bracket. All brackets were double elimination format, with the exception of the 2-team bracket which was a best of 3 format. The top team in each bracket advanced to the 1977 Division II College World Series.

New England Regional

Middle Atlantic Regional
 (3–0)
 (1–2)
 (0–2)

Shippensburg State won regional

South Atlantic Regional
 (4–1)
 (2–2)
 (1–2)
 (0–2)

Valdosta State won regional

South Regional
 (3–0)
 (2–2)
 (1–2)
 (0–2)

Eckerd College won regional

Great Lakes Regional
 (3–0)
 (2–2)
 (1–2)
 (0–2)

SIU Edwardsville won regional

North Central Regional
 (4–0)
 (3–2)
 (2–2)
 (1–2)
 (0–2)
 (0–2)

UMSL won regional

South Central Regional
 (2–1)
 (1–2)

Delta State won regional

West Regional

College World Series

Participants

Bracket

Game results

See also
 1977 NCAA Division I baseball tournament
 1977 NCAA Division III baseball tournament
 1977 NAIA World Series

References

NCAA Division II tournament
NCAA Division II Baseball Tournament
NCAA Division II baseball tournament